The following is a list of Australian radio station callsigns beginning with the number 3, indicating radio stations in the state of Victoria.

Defunct callsigns

References

 
Radio station callsigns, Victoria
Radio station callsigns
Lists of radio stations in Australia